Osgood's horseshoe bat (Rhinolophus osgoodi) is a species of bat in the family Rhinolophidae. It is endemic to China. Its name refers to Wilfred Hudson Osgood.

References

Mammals of China
Rhinolophidae
Mammals described in 1939
Taxonomy articles created by Polbot
Bats of Asia
Taxa named by Colin Campbell Sanborn